Who Needs Actions When You Got Words is the debut studio album released by British rapper and songwriter Plan B on 26 June 2006. The album was recorded with producers such as Fraser T Smith, Paul Epworth, The Earlies and The Nextmen. The title of the album derives from a line in the Meat Puppets song "Plateau".

Background
The vinyl version of the album was released as a double 12" vinyl, and bonus 7" vinyl, containing a total of fourteen tracks. The vinyl version featured the tracks in a slightly different order than the standard release, and also includes "Breakdown", and the Earlies version of "Sick 2 Def", in place of the standard version, however, the track "Everyday" is omitted. A deluxe edition of the album was issued in certain territories in 2007, containing the all-new collaborative single with Epic Man, More is Enough. The album received very favourable reviews from critics in the hip-hop, indie and mainstream communities. In 2006, Q Magazine rated the album sixty-fourth in their 100 Best Albums of 2006. The album reached and peaked at No. 30 on the UK Albums Chart, when it was released on 26 June 2006. In February 2010, three and a half years after its release, the album was certified Silver by British Phonographic Industry for selling over 60,000 copies.

Singles
"Kidz / Dead and Buried" was released on 8 September 2005 as the lead single from the album. The single was available as a limited edition 7" vinyl single, limited to 500 copies, and released on Plan B's own record label, Pet Cemetery Records. The promotional CD single was accompanied by the previously unreleased track "Young Girl". A video for "Dead and Buried" features clips from the film Kidulthood, but does not feature Drew. "Sick 2 Def" was released on 3 December 2005 as the second single from the album. The single was available as a two-track CD single and a limited edition 7" vinyl. The single was backed by fellow album track, "No Good". The single was released on 679 Recordings. No music video was filmed for the track. "Missing Links" was released on 18 January 2006, as the third single from the album. The track was only released as a promotional single, due to permission being refused to release the sample of "Pyramid Song" by Radiohead as part of the single. The track was Plan B's first single to have an official accompanying music video. * "More Is Enough" was released as a collaborative single with Epic Man on 21 April 2006. Although not included on the original version of the album, the song appears as the first track on the deluxe edition of the record, Enough is Enough. A music video was filmed for the release, which was available on limited edition 7" vinyl only.

"Mama (Loves a Crackhead)" was released as the album's fifth single on 10 July 2006. The single was Plan B's first single to be released on multiple formats, including limited edition 7" vinyl, CD single and DVD single, and was Plan B's first track to appear on the UK Singles Chart, peaking at No. 41. A music video was released for the track. "No More Eatin'" was released on 30 October 2006 as the album's sixth single. The single lead two exclusive releases - No More Eatin': Live at The Pet Cemetery EP and No More Eatin': The Remixes EP. The single was available on both CD single and limited edition 7" and 12" vinyl. An acoustic music video was filmed for the track. "No Good" was released on 19 February 2007 as the album's seventh and final single. The track's music video was filmed in December 2005 when it appeared as the B-side to the single "Sick 2 Def". The single was released on limited edition 12" vinyl and as a DVD single. For the single release, the track was remixed by Jeremy Wheatley. Although not officially released as singles, music videos were filmed for the "No Good" b-side track "Bizness Woman", featuring Killa Kela, and for the album track, "Charmaine", was released to music channels in April 2007, and the album's title track, "Who Needs Actions When You Got Words", was released as a promotional single in June 2007.

Track listing

Personnel
Plan B - vocal, guitar, producer, mixing, art direction

Production
 Fraser T Smith – producer, mixing		
 Paul Epworth – producer, mixing			
 Eliot James – producer, engineer, mixing	
 Sam Williams – producer, mixing					
 The Nextmen – producer
 ALX – producer
 The Earlies – co-producers	
 Jonathan Quarmby – additional producer, mixing	
 Kevin Bacon – additional producer, mixing
 Finn Eiles – engineer, mixing			
 Jimmy Robertson – engineer, mixing			
 Tesfa Pitt – engineer, programming
 Alan O'Connell – engineer
 Tom Knott – engineer
 Analog Kid – drum programming	
 Brad Ellis – drum programming, mixing
 Dominic Betmead – mixing
 John Davis – mastering	

Additional musicians
 NY – backing vocals, additional vocals
 Akatriel – additional vocals
 Randolph Matthews – backing vocals
 Andrew Smith – guitar
 Tom Knott – guitar
 Jamie King – guitar
 Dominic Betmead – guitar, turntables
 Andy Sheldrake – bass
 Christian Madden – keyboard
 Cassell The BeatMaker – drums
 Richard Young – drums
 Harry Escott – cello
 Kai Fish – cello
 Eliot James – cello, piano
 Alex Berry – double bass
 Beni G – turntables

Other personnel
 Ben Drury – design, additional photography, art direction
 Neil Gavin – photography
 Ben Sansbury – graphic design	
 Dan Stacey – A&R
 Nicky Stein – legal		

Sample credits
"No Good" incorporates elements of "You're No Good for Me" by Kelly Charles.
"Mama (Loves a Crackhead)" incorporates elements of "I Can't Go for That (No Can Do)" by Hall & Oates.
"Charmaine" incorporates elements "Young Girl" by Gary Puckett & the Union Gap.

Release history

Chart performance

Weekly charts

Certifications

Tour

Live band
 Plan B – vocals, guitar
 Tom Wright-Goss – guitar
 Andy Sheldrake – bass
 Cassell The BeatMaker – drums
 Beni G – DJ, turntables

Support acts
 Example (July 2006, January–February 2007)
 Professor Green (January–February 2007)
 Hadouken! (January–February 2007)
 Killa Kela (January–February 2007)

Tour dates

Festivals and other miscellaneous performances

 As part of Nasty Fest
 As part of Ashton Court Festival
 As part of Summer Sonic Festival
 As part of Reading and Leeds Festivals
 As part of T on the Fringe
 As part of Les Inrocks Festival
 As part of SXSW
 As part of Wireless Festival
 As part of Glastonbury Festival
 As part of Radar Live Festival
 As part of T in the Park
 As part of Pohoda Festival
 As part of Electric Gardens
 As part of V Festival

References

External links
 
 
 
 Who Needs Actions When You Got Words at Metacritic

2006 debut albums
679 Artists albums
Albums produced by Fraser T. Smith
Albums produced by Jonathan Quarmby
Albums produced by Kevin Bacon (producer)
Albums produced by Paul Epworth
Plan B (musician) albums